Cornelius Amory Pugsley Sr. (July 17, 1850 – September 10, 1936) was the Democratic Congressman from New York's 16th congressional district from 1901 to 1903. He was also President of the New York State Bankers Association in 1913. He created the Pugsley Medal in 1928 to honor champions of parks and conservation.

Biography
He was born in Peekskill, New York on July 17, 1850 to Gilbert T. Pugsley and a Meeker. Cornelius was a direct descendant of James Pugsley, who emigrated from England in 1680. Pugsley attended public schools and was instructed in higher education by a private tutor. His first job was as a clerk at the Peekskill, New York post office, he later served as the assistant postmaster from 1867 to 1870.

He engaged in the banking business in 1870. He served as president of the board of trustees of the Peekskill Military Academy.

Congress 
Pugsley was elected as a Democrat to the Fifty-seventh Congress (March 4, 1901 – March 3, 1903).
He was an unsuccessful candidate for reelection in 1902 to the Fifty-eighth Congress.

Later career 
He resumed banking in Peekskill.
He served as president general of the Sons of the American Revolution in 1906 and 1907.
He served as delegate to the 1908 Democratic National Convention.
He served as president of the New York State Bankers' Association in 1913.
He served as president of the Westchester County National Bank, Peekskill, New York.
He served as member of the Westchester County Park Commission.

Mr. Pugsley was President of The Field Library Board of Trustees from the date of its incorporation, April 7, 1887, until his demise September 10, 1936.  In 1929, a Memorial in Books Fund was established in Pugsley's honor by his son, Chester DeWitt Pugsley, also a Field Library Trustee.

Family 
He married Emma Catherine Gregory on April 7, 1886 and had a son, Chester DeWitt Pugsley who was an alternate delegate to Democratic National Convention from New York in 1916. Emma was the daughter of John H. Gregory.

Death 
He died in Peekskill, New York, on September 10, 1936, and was interred in Raymond Hill Cemetery, Carmel, New York.

References

External links

Cornelius Amory Pugsley archive
Who was Cornelius Amory Pugsley? American Academy for Park and Recreation Administration

Pugsley Medal winners

1850 births
1936 deaths
Democratic Party members of the United States House of Representatives from New York (state)